This national electoral calendar for 2010 lists the national/federal elections held in 2010 in all sovereign states and their dependent territories. By-elections are excluded, though national referendums are included.

January
 10 January: Croatia, President (2nd round)
 17 January:
 Chile, President (2nd round)
 Ukraine, President (1st round)
 22 January: Netherlands Antilles, Parliament
 25 January: Saint Kitts and Nevis, Parliament
 26 January: Sri Lanka, President

February
 3 February: Greece, President (by the parliament)
 7 February:
 Costa Rica, President and Parliament
 Ukraine, President (2nd round)
 15 February: Anguilla, Parliament
 27 February: Nauru, Constitutional referendum
 28 February: Tajikistan, Parliament

March
 4 March: Togo, President
 6 March: Iceland, Debt repayment referendum
 7 March:
 Iraq, Parliament 
 Switzerland, Referendum
 14 March: Colombia, Parliament

April
 8 April: Sri Lanka, Parliament
 11 April: Hungary, Parliament (1st round)
 11–15 April: Sudan, President and Parliament
 18 April: Northern Cyprus, President
 24 April: Nauru, Parliament 
 25 April:
 Austria, President
 Hungary, Parliament (2nd round)

May
 5 May: Mauritius, Parliament
 6 May: United Kingdom, Parliament
 10 May: Philippines, President, House of Representatives, Senate (one half)
 16 May: Dominican Republic, Parliament
 23 May:
 Ethiopia, Parliament
 Nagorno-Karabakh, Parliament
 24 May: Trinidad and Tobago, Parliament
 25 May: Suriname, Parliament
 28–29 May: Czech Republic, Parliament
 30 May: Colombia, President (1st round)

June
 1 and 8 June: Egypt, Shura Council
 6 June: Slovenia, Border dispute agreement referendum
 9 June: Netherlands, Parliament
 12 June: Slovakia, Parliament
 13 June: Belgium, Parliament
 19 June: Nauru, Parliament
 20 June:
 Colombia, President (2nd round)
 Poland, President (1st round)
 26 June: Somaliland, President
 27 June:
 Guinea, President (1st round)
 Kyrgyzstan, Constitutional referendum
 28 June: Burundi, President
 29 June: Hungary, President (indirect)
 30 June: Germany, President (indirect)

July
 4 July: Poland, President (2nd round)
 11 July: Japan, House of Councillors
 19 July: Suriname, President (indirect)
 23 July: Burundi, National Assembly
 28 July: Burundi, Senate (indirect)

August
 1 August: São Tomé and Príncipe, Parliament
 4 August:
 Kenya, Constitutional referendum
 Solomon Islands, Parliament
 9 August: Rwanda, President
 21 August: Australia, Parliament

September
 5 September: Moldova, Constitutional referendum
 12 September: Turkey, Constitutional referendum
 16 September: Tuvalu, Parliament
 17 September: Sint Maarten, Parliament
 18 September:
 Afghanistan, Parliament
 Slovakia, Political reform referendum
 19 September: Sweden, General
 22 September: Switzerland, Federal Council (indirect)
 26 September:
 Venezuela, Parliament
 Switzerland, Referendum

October
 2 October: Latvia, Parliament
 3 October:
 Brazil, President (1st round) and Parliament
 Bosnia and Herzegovina, President and Parliament
 10 October: Kyrgyzstan, Parliament
 15–16 October: Czech Republic, Senate (1st round) (a third)
 22–23 October: Czech Republic, Senate (2nd round) (a third) 
 23 October: Bahrain, Parliament (1st round) 
 30 October: Bahrain, Parliament (2nd round) 
 31 October:
 Brazil, President (2nd round)
 Côte d'Ivoire, President (1st round) 
 Niger, Constitutional referendum
 Tanzania, President and Parliament

November
 1 November: Nauru, President (indirect)
 2 November:
 United States, House of Representatives and Senate (one third: Class 3 senators)
 American Samoa, Parliament and Constitutional referendum  
Guam, Governor, Attorney General, Consolidated Commission on Utilities, Parliament, and Supreme Court and Superior Court retention elections
 United States Virgin Islands, Governor and Parliament
 7 November:
 Comoros, President (1st round Mohéli primary) 
 Burma (Myanmar), General 
 Azerbaijan, Parliament
 Guinea, President (2nd round)
 9 November: Jordan, Parliament
 17 November:
 Cook Islands, Parliament and referendum
 Madagascar, Constitutional referendum 
 21 November: Burkina Faso, President
 25 November: Tonga, General
 27 November: Iceland, Constitutional Assembly
 28 November:
 Côte d'Ivoire, President (2nd round) 
 Moldova, Parliament
 Haiti, Parliament and President (1st round)
 Egypt, Parliament (1st round)

December
 5 December: Egypt, Parliament (2nd round)
 12 December:
 Kosovo, Parliament
 Slovenia, Referendum
 Transnistria, Parliament
 13 December: Saint Vincent and the Grenadines, Parliament
 19 December: Belarus, President
 26 December: Comoros, President (2nd round nationwide)

Indirect elections
20–22 January: Uzbekistan, Senate
3 February: Greece, President
20 February: Afghanistan, House of Elders
15 March, 5 May and 21 June: Isle of Man, Legislative Council
26 March, 14 June, 17 June and 10 July: India, Council of States
1 April: San Marino, Captains Regent
23 April: Tajikistan, National Assembly
21 May: Sudan, Council of States
23 May: Ethiopia, House of Federation
24 June, 21 October and 25 November: Austria, Federal Council
29 June: Hungary, President
19 July: Suriname, President
28 July: Burundi, Senate
1 October: San Marino, Captains Regent
1 November: Nauru, President
11 November: Iraq, President
26–27 November: Namibia, National Council
3 December: Bosnia and Herzegovina, House of Peoples

References

2010 elections